David A. Aitken was a state planning officer of the Ipoh Town Council (now known as the City Council) in early 1961. Ipoh is the capital city of the Malaysian state of Perak. He worked under the administration of E. G. Waller. Aitken and Waller, from their positions as planners, were key figures in bringing architectural modernism to Southeast Asia. They oversaw an extremely ambitious development period in central Malaysia that saw major projects in the public and private sectors. They also helped shift the perception of public housing away from colonial schemes to relocate Chinese villages and thereby fight communism. Under their leadership, Ipoh became a hotbed of architectural modernism, and was an active part in the global effort to combat poverty and provide decent low-cost housing through multiple projects, large and small.

In 1961, D. A. Aitken was the mastermind behind the most prominent public housing project, the Sungei Pari Towers. He prepared the layout and scheme with a Municipal Engineer, Mr. E. B. Carlos. No architect other than Aitken is credited for its innovative design. Aitken served in the Town council, and was also a state planning officer. Aitken was an advocate for the benefits of high-rises as part of development schemes. As a testament to his importantance to the region and the nation, Jalan Aitken in Ipoh was named by Yap Lim Seng in his honor.

Sungei Pari Towers (Ipoh, Malaysia)

Sungei Pari Tower (Sungai Pari Tower) is a public housing project which was built in 1962. It is located by the Pari River and west of Ipoh Railway Station. The central tower has 18 storeys. Surrounded by multiple low-rise units on a 9-acre site, the entire development was designed to house 500 families. The scheme and layout of this public housing project was prepared by Mr D. A. Aitken and Mr E. B. Carlos. It shares many features in common with the Unité d’habitation by Le Corbusier, and thus brought the developments of French modernism to Malaysia. It has a lively roof landscape that includes a giant asymmetrical overhanging dish that provides shade. Individual residential units are open to both the north and south sides and therefore benefit from cross breezes. Even the wayfinding system and building signage utilizes the Charette font that Le Corbusier favored. The children's playground equipment was in the form of cubist sculptures, underscoring the project's commitment to the international style.

References

Living people
Modernist architecture
Public housing
Year of birth missing (living people)